was a Japanese daimyō of the early Edo period. He was the eldest son of Date Masamune, born in 1591 by Shinzo no Kata (a concubine). Coming of age while living with Toyotomi Hideyoshi, he received a character from Hideyoshi's name and took the adult name of Hidemune. After Hideyoshi's death in 1600, he was made a hostage at the residence of Ukita Hideie.

Though he was Masamune's eldest son, Hidemune was born by a concubine, and therefore could not be the successor to the Sendai Domain, which his father ruled. Masamune therefore considered the possibility of having Hidemune start a branch family. This was made possible in 1614, when father and son took part in the Osaka Campaign: Hidemune received the 100,000 koku Uwajima Domain which Tokugawa Ieyasu granted to Masamune. Hidemune immediately entered his new fief as daimyō, and ruled until his retirement in Meireki 3 (1657).

References

This article was composed from corresponding content on the Japanese Wikipedia.

Daimyo
Samurai
1591 births
1658 deaths
Date clan